Zdeněk "Steve" Tikal (15 June 1929 – 20 November 1991) was an Australian ice hockey player. Born in Czechoslovakia, he fled to Australia with his father in 1948. At the 1960 Winter Olympics he was severely injured in his first match against Czechoslovaks, who considered him a traitor, and had to sit out the rest of the tournament. His brother František played against him at those Olympics.

References

1929 births
1991 deaths
Australian ice hockey forwards
Czechoslovak emigrants to Australia
Czechoslovak ice hockey forwards
Ice hockey players at the 1960 Winter Olympics
Olympic ice hockey players of Australia
People from České Budějovice District